GEMS World Academy (Dubai) is an international private school, located in DubaiUAE. The school is managed by GEMS Education. Founded in 2007, it follows the International Baccalaureate Curriculum, and offers education to students ranging from Grade R to Grade 12. As of October 2018, the school has capacity for 2,050 students.

History 
GEMS World Academy (Dubai) was established by GEMS Education in 2007 and started operations in 2008. In 2010 GWA became an International Baccalaureate-certified school after the accreditation of its IB Diploma Programme course. The IB Primary Years Programme was also accredited later that year. In 2011, the school's Middle Years Programme was accredited by the IB. The Career Related Programme started in September 2017. By May 2019, the school had 184 teachers from 27 nations. 

In 2022, the average IB Diploma Programme point score was 34.2 out 45.

Campus 
GEMS World Academy (Dubai) covers 50,125 sq. meters of land. A library and a planetarium are present in the building. It also features a 604-seat auditorium, a symphony centre, and a designated garden on the roof.

GEMS World Academy (Dubai) provides an extensive Language Institute and Entrepreneurship Club in addition to a vast variety of after-school activities. Offered activities include golf, swimming, cross-country, basketball, rock-climbing, horseback riding, skiing, dance, martial arts, and more, are also provided on or off campus by external companies. 

GEMS World Academy (Dubai) offers 13 different language courses for the students as part of the school curriculum, at no additional cost.

The sports facilities present include a 400 meter athletic track and a weather-proof artificial pitch; an Olympic sized swimming pool and a trainer pool; covered tennis and squash courts; a large gymnasium, fitness centre as well as a junior gym and indoor climbing wall.

Curriculum 
GEMS World Academy (Dubai) follows the IB Curriculum, offering the Primary Years Programme for the elementary school students (Pre-K – Grade 5), the Middle Years Programme for middle school students (Grade 6–10), and the Diploma Programme and the Career Programme for senior students (Grade 11 and 12).

IB Diploma Courses Offered
Group 1: Studies in Language and Literature
Language and Literature HL
Language and Literature SL
Literature HL

Group 2: Language Acquisition 
Arabic
French
Spanish
English B

Group 3: Individuals and Society
Business Management
Economics
Global Politics
History
Psychology

Group 4: Sciences
Biology
Chemistry
Physics
Nature of Sciences
Design Technology

Group 5: Maths Analysis and Maths Application
Math HL
Math SL
Math Studies

Group 6: The Arts
Theatre
Visual Arts
Music

Extra-curricular activities

Week Without Walls (WWW) 
Week Without Walls (WWW) is a mandatory activity, with students either taking a trip to other countries, or being assigned to a local activity. During the week of travel, students are expected "to engage in sustainable service and/or gain awareness of issues that transcend national borders". The activity counts towards Community, Action and Service for IB Diploma students, and towards Service as Action for MYP students.

Sports 
As of December 2016, the competitive sports offered include football, netball, swimming, track and field, basketball, rugby, cricket, volleyball, tennis, badminton, golf, skiing, aquathlon and water polo. Other activities offered include climbing and holiday camps.

KHDA Inspection Report

The Knowledge and Human Development Authority (KHDA) is an educational quality assurance authority based in Dubai, United Arab Emirates. It undertakes early learning, school and higher learning institution management and rates them, based on the performance of both the students and the teachers, with ratings ranging from "Unsatisfactory" to "Outstanding". Below is a summary of the inspection ratings for GEMS World Academy.

References

Schools in Dubai
GEMS schools
International Baccalaureate schools in the United Arab Emirates
Educational institutions established in 2007
2007 establishments in the United Arab Emirates